Toro Negro (Spanish for black bull) can refer to:

 Toro Negro, Ciales, Puerto Rico
 Toro Negro State Forest, Puerto Rico
 Toro Negro River, Puerto Rico
 The Black Bull (film), a 1959 Mexican film